Nicole Zaloumis is a sports broadcaster, who last worked for as co-host of "Left Coast Live" on Mad Dog Sports Radio on SiriusXM Satellite Radio. Additionally, Zaloumis was previously the Host of NFL Network's weekday morning show NFL AM.

Early years
Zaloumis was raised in Danville, California and is of Greek descent.  She also graduated at the University of San Francisco in 2003.

Career
Prior to working at NFL Network, in 2004, she was the weekend sports anchor at WRC-TV in Washington, DC, where she also was the host of a weekly sports show on the Washington Redskins. She also reported on the three Arizona professional sports teams during her time as a weekend anchor for ABC 15 in Phoenix. She previously worked at the Big Ten Network along with Comcast SportsNet New England where she was a daily sports anchor. In the summer of 2012, She joined NFL Network to become the host of the new weekday morning show NFL AM. In June 2014, It was announced her departure from NFL AM was to spend more time with her family. She appeared as a guest host on the August 14, 2014 edition of Fox Sports Live on Fox Sports 1.

References

External links
Nicole Zaloumis Website

Living people
1980 births
American television sports anchors
People from Danville, California
University of San Francisco alumni
Television anchors from Washington, D.C.